The athletics competition at the 1986 Asian Games was held in Olympic Stadium, Seoul, South Korea.

Medalists

Men

Women

Medal table

References
Asian Games Results. GBR Athletics. Retrieved on 2014-10-04.
Women's relay medallists. Incheon2014. Retrieved on 2014-10-04.
Men's relay medallists. Incheon2014. Retrieved on 2014-10-04.

External links
Medalists

 
1986 Asian Games events
1986
Asian Games
1986 Asian Games